Umgeni Park is a residential area in northern Durban, KwaZulu-Natal, South Africa.  Together with its neighbouring Durban North suburb of Athlone, the area is also known as Riverside, due to its location along the northern banks of the Umgeni River. The area is marked by its cluster developments and townhouse complexes, as well as free standing homes.  On the western boundary of the suburb is the Briardene Informal Settlement and the Umgeni Park light industrial area.

The suburb is home to the Umgeni River Bird Park. Rosehill Primary School, on the border with the suburb of Park Hill, serves the area.

References

Suburbs of Durban